Uhřičice is a municipality and village in Přerov District in the Olomouc Region of the Czech Republic. It has about 500 inhabitants.

Notable people
Jan Tomáš Kuzník (1716–1786), composer, poet and teacher

References

Villages in Přerov District